The  Washington Redskins season was the franchise's 17th season in the National Football League (NFL) and their 12th in Washington, D.C.  the team improved on their 4–8 record from 1947 and finished 7-5.

Regular season

Schedule

Standings

Roster

References

Washington
Washington Redskins seasons
Washington